Bedelia is a genus of leaf beetles in the subfamily Eumolpinae. It is generally distributed in the Caucasus, Central Asia and East Asia. It was first described by Édouard Lefèvre in 1875, for two species from Persia collected by Ernest Marie Louis Bedel (which are now considered to be the same species). It was considered by Lefèvre to be a neighbour of Chloropterus.

Species
 Bedelia insignis Lefèvre, 1875 (Synonyms: Bedelia angustata Lefèvre, 1875; Nodostoma kokanica Solsky, 1881)
 Bedelia kaschgarica Lopatin, 1962
 Bedelia viridicoerulea Reitter, 1901

References

Eumolpinae
Chrysomelidae genera
Beetles of Asia
Taxa named by Édouard Lefèvre